is a Japanese politician of the Democratic Party of Japan (DPJ), a member of the House of Representatives in the Diet (national legislature). A native of Kawagoe, Saitama, she attended Keio University and received a master's degree from Nihon University. After having served in the assembly of Saitama Prefecture for two terms since 1995, she ran unsuccessfully for the House of Representatives in 2000 as an independent and in 2001 as a member of Ichirō Ozawa's Liberal Party. She ran once again in 2003, this time as a member of the DPJ, and was elected for the first time.

References

External links 
 Official website in Japanese.

Members of the House of Representatives (Japan)
Female members of the House of Representatives (Japan)
Keio University alumni
Nihon University alumni
Politicians from Saitama Prefecture
Living people
1965 births
Liberal Party (Japan, 1998) politicians
Democratic Party of Japan politicians
People's Life Party politicians
21st-century Japanese politicians
21st-century Japanese women politicians